Choi Kin is one of the 29 constituencies in the Sai Kung District.

The constituency returns one district councillor to the Sai Kung District Council, with an election every four years.

Choi Kin constituency is loosely based on Choi Ming Court and part of Kin Ming Estate in Tiu Keng Leng with estimated population of 19,778.

Councillors represented

Election results

2010s

References

Tiu Keng Leng
Constituencies of Hong Kong
Constituencies of Sai Kung District Council
2003 establishments in Hong Kong
Constituencies established in 2003